Rocky Ford station was an Atchison, Topeka and Santa Fe Railway station in Rocky Ford, Colorado. The station is located two blocks south of U.S. Highway 50 and State Highway 71. The station has been restored and is now used by the Rocky Ford Chamber of Commerce. It was on the Denver Branch, connecting La Junta and Denver. The line is now owned by BNSF.

References

External links
Picture
Rocky Ford Depot (Surviving Santa Fe Depots)
Station from Google Maps Street View

Atchison, Topeka and Santa Fe Railway stations
Former railway stations in Colorado
Transportation buildings and structures in Otero County, Colorado
Railway stations in the United States opened in 1903
Railway stations closed in 1979